{{DISPLAYTITLE:Omega2 Aquarii}}

Omega2 Aquarii, Latinised from ω2 Aquarii, is the Bayer designation for a triple star system in the equatorial constellation of Aquarius. It can be seen with the naked eye, having an apparent visual magnitude of 4.49. The approximate distance to this star, is known from parallax measurements taken during the Hipparcos mission.

The primary component of this system is a massive, B-type main-sequence star with a stellar classification of B9 V. This star has nearly double the radius of the Sun and is spinning rapidly with a projected rotational velocity of 148 km/s.

There is a close orbiting stellar companion of unknown type, with a third component at an angular separation of 5.7 arcseconds. The latter is a K-type main-sequence star with a visual magnitude of 9.5. This system is among the 100 strongest stellar X-ray sources within  of the Sun. It is emitting an X-ray luminosity of  s−1.

References

External links
 Image Omega2 Aquarii

222661
Aquarii, Omega2
Aquarius (constellation)
Aquarii, 105
B-type main-sequence stars
116971
8988
9836
BD-15 6476